Shorea laxa (called, along with some other species in the genus Shorea, yellow meranti) is a species of plant in the family Dipterocarpaceae. It is a tree endemic to Borneo. The species is common in numerous protected areas and no longer considered threatened.

References

laxa
Endemic flora of Borneo
Trees of Borneo
Taxonomy articles created by Polbot